NNA may refer to:

 Kenitra Air Base, Morocco (IATA code)
 National Newspaper Awards, for Canadian journalism
 National Newspaper Association, an American organization for community newspapers
 National Notary Association, an American organization for notaries public
 National numbering agency for International Securities Identifying Number
 A neural network accelerator, a specialised hardware computer system to speed up artificial intelligence or machine learning applications